The Imperial Hotel, formerly Puma Hotels Collection, is a  4-star hotel located on the northern promenade in Blackpool, Lancashire, England. It was established in 1867 and is situated in a large Victorian red brick building, in what, before development, was Claremont Park. Owned by Barceló Hotels for many years, it was operated by The Hotel Collection from June 2014 who sold it to the Fragrance Group (Singapore) for £12.8 in 2017. The hotel has a gold and blue facade, 180 rooms, The Palm Court Restaurant and the Number 10 Bar.

Granada Television once set up a studio in the hotel to cover party conferences held in the town. It has been used as a conference and party venue for a wide range of organisations. The Queen has stayed at this hotel when visiting Blackpool, as did Charles Dickens and many British Prime Ministers.

The Imperial Hotel hosted concerts in its ballroom in the 1970s. Bands that performed at the Imperial Hotel include UFO, Judas Priest and Joy Division.

See also
Imperial Hydropathic Hotel Co v Hampson, an 1883 landmark UK company law case, concerning the interpretation of a company's articles of association.

References

External links
The Imperial Hotel in Blackpool
Book the Imperial Hotel in Blackpool

Hotels in Blackpool
Hotels established in 1867